Bardoli is one of the 182 Legislative Assembly constituencies of Gujarat state in India. It is part of Surat district and is reserved for candidates belonging to the Scheduled Castes.

List of segments
This assembly seat represents the following segments,

 Bardoli Taluka (Part) Villages – Mota, Movachhi, Moti Falod, Bharampor, Vaghecha Kadod, Bhamaiya, Uchharel, Haripura, Kadod, Singod, Bamni, Samthan, Kantali, Pardi Kadod, Ruwa, Varad, Isanpor, Kharvasa, Umrakh, Baben, Astan, Panada, Rajpura Lumbha, Rayam, Khoj, Palsod, Akoti, Orgam, Sankri, Dhamdod Lumbha, Ten, Nadida, Khali, Tajpor Khurd, Utara, Afva, Isroli, Tajpore Bujrang, Goji, Bamroli, Ninat, Pathradiya, Nizar, Babla, Sarbhon, Bhuvasan, Zakharda, Ancheli, Vadoli, Naugama, Vaghech Sarbhon, Pardi Vagha, Tarbhon, Kuvadiya, Chhitra, Kharad, Bardoli (M)
 Palsana Taluka
 Choryasi Taluka (Part) Villages- Vedchha, Sabargam, Kumbharia, Devadh, Dakhkhanvada, Deladva, Mohni, Timbarva, Goja, Khambhasla, Bonand, Ravla (Vaktana), Bhatia, Vanz, Lajpor, Popda, Kapletha, Kachholi, Samrod.

Members of Legislative Assembly

Election results

2022

2017

2012

See also
 List of constituencies of the Gujarat Legislative Assembly
 Surat district
 Gujarat Legislative Assembly

References

External links
 

Assembly constituencies of Gujarat
Surat district